Ardrossan South Beach railway station is one of three in the town of Ardrossan, North Ayrshire, Scotland. The station is managed by ScotRail and is on the Ayrshire Coast Line.

History 

The station was opened on 1 January 1883 by the Glasgow and South Western Railway, during the extension of the former Ardrossan Railway to Largs. It became part of the London, Midland & Scottish Railway during the Grouping of 1923. The station then passed on to the Scottish Region of British Railways on nationalisation in 1948.

When sectorisation was introduced in the 1980s, the station was served by ScotRail until the privatisation of British Rail.

Originally a two side platform station, the eastbound platform was demolished in 1987, with passenger trains for both directions now using the westbound platform. The eastbound track remains and is used for freight (mainly to and from Hunterston Terminal). A ticket office is still present at this station and is staffed for most services.  The short (1 mile/1.6 km) branch line to  diverges just to the northwest at Holm Junction, providing rail access to the ferry terminal used by the Caledonian MacBrayne sailings to the Isle of Arran.

There were locomotive sheds just slightly to the west of the station, built in 1881. This was a fairly large complex including offices, stores and workshops and employed over 300 people at its peak. The succession of diesel engines over steam led to the sheds' demise, and they were demolished in 1975. A single siding is in place at the site.

Facilities 
The station has a small car park (23 spaces) and ticket office staffed seven days a week.

Services

2009 

On Sundays, there is usually an hourly service towards Glasgow Central and Largs with extra services to Ardrossan Harbour, connecting with the ferry.

From December 2011 
 2 trains per hour to 
Some services are timed to coincide with the Caledonian MacBrayne ferry service to Brodick on the Isle of Arran.

On Sundays, there are usually hourly services towards Glasgow Central and Largs, with five services to Ardrossan Harbour connecting with the ferry.

References

Notes

Sources

External links

 Ardrossan South beach Railway Station
 Stations on navigable O.S. map. Used station near Golf Course on line towards Stevenston.

Railway stations in North Ayrshire
Former Glasgow and South Western Railway stations
Railway stations in Great Britain opened in 1883
Railway stations served by ScotRail
SPT railway stations
Ardrossan−Saltcoats−Stevenston